KRCN (1060 kHz) is an AM radio station broadcasting a Catholic radio format. Licensed to Longmont, Colorado, the station is owned and operated by Catholic Radio Network, Inc., which has a network of stations in Missouri, Kansas and Colorado.  In Colorado, the Catholic Radio Network also operates KFEL 970 AM in Colorado Springs and KCRN 1120 AM in Limon.

KRCN broadcasts at 50,000 watts, the maximum power for FCC-licensed AM radio stations.  But because AM 1060 is a clear channel frequency reserved for Class A XEEP Mexico City and KYW Philadelphia, KRCN must greatly reduce nighttime power.  It drops to only 111 watts at sunset.  KRCN can also be heard on an FM translator station in Greeley, Colorado, 92.1 K221GI.

History

In December 1949, the station first signed on as KLMO, originally at 1050 kHz.  It was a 250-watt daytimer, required to be off the air at night, and owned by the Longmont Broadcasting Company.  In 1965, it shifted to 1060 kHz, and in the 1970s increased its power to 10,000 watts, but still daytime only.  In the 1980s, KLMO received Federal Communications Commission approval to broadcast around the clock, but with only a small amount of power at night.

The station aired a full service country music format for Longmont and the northern suburbs of Denver.  On March 22, 2000, the Radio Colorado Network was launched.  The station's format switched to Business and Personal Finance programming, targeting the Denver radio market.

On January 1, 2015, KRCN became an owned and operated affiliate of the Catholic Radio Network, based in Kansas City, Missouri.

References

External links
 

 

Longmont, Colorado
Catholic radio stations
RCN
Radio stations established in 1949
1949 establishments in Colorado